Discodoris pliconoto is a species of sea slug, a dorid nudibranch, shell-less marine opisthobranch gastropod molluscs in the family Discodorididae.

Distribution
This species was described from the island of Sal, Cape Verde. The specimens were found in the intertidal zone or up to 1 m depth.

Description
Discodoris pliconoto is a large dorid nudibranch, growing to at least 80 mm in length. It is cream-white in colour with diffuse spots of pale brown.

References

Discodorididae
Gastropods described in 2015
Fauna of Sal, Cape Verde